State Route 397 (SR 397), also known as the Mack Hatcher Memorial Parkway, is a primary state route that serves as the perimeter road for the city of Franklin, Tennessee. Throughout its length, SR 397 also carries the designations of U.S. Route 31 Truck (US 31 Truck) and U.S. Route 431 Truck (US 431 Truck).

Route description 

SR 397 begins as a two-lane highway south of Franklin at an intersection with  US 31 / SR 6 (Columbia Avenue), where it picks up US 31 Truck. It heads east to cross over some railroad tracks before passing through subdivisions and coming to an intersection with US 431 / SR 106 (Lewisburg Pike), where it picks up US 431 Truck. The highway then crosses the Harpeth River to turn north and pass through more wooded areas before having an intersection with SR 96 (Murfreesboro Road), where it widens to 4-lane divided highway. SR 397 passes by more subdivisions before curving to the west and passing through more rural areas to have another intersection with US 31/SR 6 (Franklin Road), where US 31 Truck ends. It continues west to cross the Harpeth River for a second time before coming to an intersection with US 431/SR 106 (Hillsboro Road). It then continues westward, crossing the Harpeth River for a third and fourth time in short succession, and shifts south before coming to an end at an intersection with SR 96 west of downtown.

History 
A bypass to divert through traffic around downtown Franklin was first proposed in 1963. Work on the first section, located between US 31 (Columbia Pike) and SR 96 (Murfreesboro Road) began in July 1983, and was completed in December 1985. The bypass was named the Mack Hatcher Memorial Parkway by an act of the Williamson County Commission on November 21, 1983, in honor of a former county commissioner and road superintendent. Construction on the next section, between SR 96 and US 31 (Franklin Road) began in March 1987, and was opened to traffic on November 17, 1988. The third section, between US 31 (Franklin Road) and US 431 (Hillsboro Road) was completed in November 1989.

It goes around the west side of Franklin. The Western Extension will create a complete perimeter around Franklin, divert through traffic from the city, and provide easy access to other nearby routes. A dedication ceremony for the section occurred on December 13, 2021, which included the naming of one of the Harpeth River bridges in memory of former state representative Charles Sargent.

Major intersections

References 

397
Transportation in Williamson County, Tennessee
Franklin, Tennessee
U.S. Route 31
U.S. Route 431